Muhammad in Europe: A Thousand Years of Western Myth-Making is a biography of Muhammad by the Iranian writer and lecturer Minou Reeves, published in 2003.

Overview
This book not only speaks about the life of Muhammad but also discusses the relationships and conflicts between the Western and Islamic worlds. The book also discusses the effect that Western attitudes have had on the Muslim psyche and attempts to explain the diverse attitudes of many modern Muslims towards the Western world today.

References

Biographies of Muhammad
2003 non-fiction books